Pietro Annoni (14 December 1886, in Milan – 19 April 1960) was an Italian rower who competed in the 1920 Summer Olympics.

In 1920 he won the silver medal with his partner Erminio Dones in the double sculls event.

References

External links
 profile

1886 births
1960 deaths
Rowers from Milan
Italian male rowers
Olympic rowers of Italy
Olympic silver medalists for Italy
Rowers at the 1920 Summer Olympics
Olympic medalists in rowing
Medalists at the 1920 Summer Olympics
European Rowing Championships medalists